Regina A. Harris Baiocchi (born July 16, 1956) is an American musician, music educator, composer and writer of short stories and poetry.

Life
Regina Harris was the third of eight children born in Chicago, Illinois, to parents Elgie Harris Jr., and Lanzie Mozelle Belmont Harris. She was exposed to the arts from an early age, took guitar lessons at age nine and began composing at ten. She studied music in high school and church music programs, and graduated from Roosevelt University with a Bachelor of Music degree in 1978. She continued her studies at the Illinois Institute of Technology, Northwest University, and graduated from New York University with a certificate in public relations in 1991 and from De Paul University with a Master of Music degree in 1995.

She married Gregory Baiocchi on July 12, 1975, and worked as a composer, writer, poet and high school teacher. From 1986–89, she worked as an audio quality control analyst for Telaction Corporation, and from 1989–94 as a public relations director for Catholic Theological Union in Chicago. After 2000, she was a lecturer at East-West University.

Honors and awards
 Poets and Patrons Award for Poetry for Teeter Totter, and Ghetto Child, 1980s
 McDonald’s Literary Achievement Award, for Mama’s Will, 1988 *Illinois Arts Council grant, 1995
 Chicago Music Association award, 1995
 Art Institute of Chicago grant for Gbeldahoven: No One’s Child, 1997
 National Endowment for the Arts Regional Artists Program grant for African Hands, 1997

Works
Baiocchi's oeuvre includes the following works:

Instrumental Music:

African Hands concerto for hand drums and orchestra, 1997
After the Rain for soprano saxophone, piano, bass, percussion, and drum kit,1994
Autumn Night for solo alto flute, 1991
Azuretta for piano, 2000
Chassé for Bb Clarinet and piano, 1978
Communion for marimba, strings, and piano, 1999
Deborah for percussion and piano, 1994
Déjà Vu for solo piano, 1999
Doxology for organ, 2011–12
Equipoise by Intersection: Two Piano Etudes, 1979/1995
Feathers, Bowties for Bb Clarinet, percussion, cello, and piano, 2009
Gullah Ghost Dances for cello, percussion, and piano, 2015
HB4A for piano, bass, drums, and saxophone, 2000
Karibu for Bb clarinet, 2007
Legacy for piano, 1992
Liszten, My Husband is Not a Hat for piano, 1994/2009
Miles Per Hour for Bb or C trumpet, 1990
Muse for orchestra, 1997
Orchestral Suite, 1992
QFX for brass quintet, 1993
Realizations for string quartet, 1979
Sketches for piano trio, 1992
Skins for percussion, 1997

Vocal Music

Ask Him for voice, piano, bass, and drums, 1999
 B’Shuv Adonai for voice, violin, piano, and percussion, 1998
 Belize for voice, alto sax, and jazz combo, 2001
 Best Friends for vocal duet and piano, 1993
 Black Voices for rapper, medium voice, piano, and drums, 1992
 Bwana’s Libation for African dancers, medium voice, bass, and percussion, 1992
 Crystal Stair for vocal duet and piano, 1992
 Cycles vocal duet and piano, 1992
 Dream Weaver for voice, alto sax, piano, bass, and drums, 1997

References

1956 births
20th-century American composers
20th-century American women musicians
20th-century American musicians
20th-century classical composers
20th-century women composers
21st-century American composers
21st-century American women musicians
21st-century classical composers
21st-century women composers
African-American classical composers
American classical composers
African-American women classical composers
African-American music educators
American women classical composers
American music educators
American women music educators
Living people
African-American women musicians
20th-century African-American women
20th-century African-American people
20th-century African-American musicians
21st-century African-American women
21st-century African-American musicians